Khalid Al Jubaya (born 1 August 1999) is a Saudi professional footballer who plays as a forward for Al-Shoulla.

Career
Al Jubaya started his career with Al-Hilal and signed his first professional contract with the club on 24 January 2019. He made his debut for the first team during the AFC Champions League match against Emirati side Al-Ain by coming off the bench at the 87th minute. On 30 August 2019, Al Jubaya joined Al-Adalah on a season-long loan. He made 3 appearances for Al-Adalah in all competitions and his loan was ended early. On 31 January 2020, Al Jubaya joined Al-Shoulla on loan until the end of the season.

References

External links 
 

1999 births
Living people
Saudi Arabian footballers
Al Hilal SFC players
Al-Adalah FC players
Al-Shoulla FC players
Association football forwards
Saudi Professional League players
Saudi First Division League players